The South Nation River is a river in Eastern Ontario, Canada.

This river is called the "South Nation River" to distinguish it from a river in Quebec north of the Ottawa River called the Petite-Nation River or rivière Petite-Nation. The names of both rivers are derived from the French name for the native people of this area, the Weskarini.

The area surrounding the river, originally covered with white pine, is now mainly used for agriculture.  The river drains an almost flat plain, and its lack of gradient makes it prone to flooding. Dams and other water control measures have been introduced to help reduce the impact of seasonal flooding in the watershed.

In some areas the river flows through Leda clays which can be very unstable. Several landslides have occurred over the past century including a major one near the former town of Lemieux on June 20, 1993. Approximately  of mud and clay slid into the river valley, blocking the river's flow for three days.

Four kilometers of river to the south of Spencerville is good for canoeing during most water conditions.  There is a public boat launch at the old mill.

Tributaries
(in downstream order)
 North Branch South Nation River
 Sandy Creek
 Payne River
 various branches of the Castor River
 Moose Creek
 Bear Brook
 Scotch River
 Caledonia Creek

Communities
(in downstream order)
 Spencerville
 South Mountain
 Chesterville
 Crysler
 St. Albert
 Casselman
 Plantagenet

See also
List of Ontario rivers

References

External links

 South Nation Conservation
 Ottawa-Gatineau Watershed Atlas (OGWA)

Rivers of Ontario
Landforms of the United Counties of Prescott and Russell